Immigration detention in the United Kingdom is the practice of detaining foreign nationals for the purpose of immigration control. Unlike some other countries, UK provisions to detain are not outlined in a codified constitution. Instead, immigration enforcement holds individuals under Powers granted in the Immigration Act 1971 and by the Home Office Detention Centre Rules (2001). The expressed purpose of immigration detention is to "effect removal; initially to establish a person's identity or basis of claim; or [implement] where there is reason to believe that the person will fail to comply with any conditions attached to a grant of immigration bail." Detention can only lawfully be exercised under these provisions where there is a "realistic prospect of removal within a reasonable period".

In 2019, a majority of immigration detainees were individuals who were seeking, or had claimed, asylum (58%). Other individuals liable for detention include those held while awaiting determination of their right to enter the UK, people who have been refused permission to enter and are awaiting removal, people who have overstayed the expiry of their visas or have not complied with their visa terms, and people lacking the required documentation to live in the UK.

The British Home Office currently operates one Pre-Departure Accommodation, three residential Short Term Holding Facilities (STHFs), seven Immigration Removal Centres (IRCs) and 13 In-Use Short-Term Holding Facilities which can be used to detain individuals under Immigration Act Powers. HM Prisons are also used as settings of detention under Immigration Powers, usually if the detainee was serving a prison sentence which expired.

The management of a majority of IRCs is outsourced to private companies including Mitie, GEO Group, G4S and Serco.

The Nationality, Immigration and Asylum Act 2002 formally changed the name of "detention centres" to "removal centres".

Removal centres
The UK removal centres are:

 Brook House Immigration Removal Centre near Gatwick Airport, which is run by G4S Group
 Colnbrook Immigration Removal Centre near Heathrow Airport which is run by Mitie
 Dungavel in Lanarkshire run by GEO Group
 Harmondsworth Immigration Removal Centre also near Heathrow Airport which is run by Mitie
 Larne House Immigration Reception Centre, Larne, Antrim which is run by Tascor, a subsidiary of Capita
 Morton Hall Immigration Removal Centre, near Newark on Trent which is run by the Her Majesty's Prison Service
 Pennine House Immigration Reception Centre, at Manchester Airport which is run by Tascor, a subsidiary of Capita
 Tinsley House Immigration Removal Centre near Gatwick Airport which is run by G4S
 Yarl's Wood Immigration Removal Centre in Bedfordshire run by Serco

Policies

The British government has been given powers to detain asylum seekers and migrants at any stage of the asylum process. The use of asylum has increased with the introduction of the process of "fast track", or the procedure by which the Immigration Service assess asylum claims which are capable of being decided quickly. Fast-tracking takes place in Oakington Reception Centre, Harmondsworth and Yarl's Wood.

There are three situations in which it is lawful to detain an asylum seeker or migrant.
 To fast track their claim
 If the government has reasonable grounds to believe that the asylum seeker or migrant will abscond or not abide by the conditions of entry.
 If the asylum seeker or migrant is about to be deported.

Figures published for January – March 2008 by the Home Office revealed the following:
 2305 people were detained in "removal centres" in the UK under Immigration Act powers (this figure excludes those held in prisons)
 1980 immigration detainees were male
 35 children under 18 were detained
 1640 detainees had claimed asylum at some stage

Once detained it is possible to apply for bail. It is preferable but not necessary to provide a surety and conditions will be provided, usually reporting, if bail is granted. There is legal aid for representation at bail hearings and the organisation Bail for Immigration Detainees provides help and assistance for those subject to detention to represent themselves.

Since summer 2005 there has been an increase in the detention of foreign nationals since the Charles Clarke scandal which revealed that there were a number of foreign nationals who had committed crimes and had not been deported at the end of their sentence.

Criticism of immigration detention focuses on comparisons with prison conditions in which persons are kept though they have never been convicted of a crime, the lack of judicial oversight, and on the lengthy bureaucratic delays that often prevent a person from being released, particularly when there is no evidence that the detainee will present a harm or a burden to society if allowed to remain at large while their situation is examined.

Recently, the conditions of detention centres have been criticised, by the United Kingdom Inspector of Prisons.

The Tinsley Model 
In 1996 Immigration Detention Centre Tinsley House was commissioned. It was the first purpose-built immigration detention facility in the United Kingdom and was initially managed by the British subsidiary of the American Wackenhut Corporation.

The original senior management of Tinsley House, specifically the centre director and its operations manager, pioneered an adapted version of Wackenhut's philosophy of "Dynamic Security" that promoted a regime of caring custody, emphasising positive relations between staff and detainees and encouraging the respectful and sensitive handling of all detainee related issues.

This concerned approach towards detainee management was quickly embraced by the centre's chaplain, who reinforced the existing commitment to caring custody through the creation of specialised training programmes for the centre's staff and by increasing the size and diversity of the centre's chaplaincy team.

With the active support of the centre's senior management, the Tinsley House chaplaincy set about the task of addressing in detail the dietary, cultural, religious and social needs of the centre's population inviting a variety of religious ministers and representatives of cultural groups to attend the centre to provide pastoral support. Tinsley House became the first detention centre in the United Kingdom to operate a comprehensive regime of religious and cultural observance and to operate a diversity of permanent religious facilities.

The attention to religious and cultural needs combined with an overt commitment on the part of the detention centre staff towards treating those in their custody with care and sensitivity began to impact the environment and operations at Tinsley House. Detainees would write messages of appreciation to members of staff noting their efforts of assistance and staff would regularly form respectful friendships with those in their charge.

The product of this regime, which became known as the "Tinsley Model" was to result in an environment which, during its first decade of operations, incurred no incidence of death, riot or disturbance; a performance which remains unmatched in the history of the UK Immigration Service.

The "Tinsley Model" attracted the attention of the Prince of Wales as well as numerous religious and political leaders and was cited as being a graphic example of the effectiveness of "caring custody".

In December 2001 the senior chaplain of Tinsley House authored a report to the Home Secretary detailing the essence of the Tinsley Model, recording its positive effects and outlining how this regime might be exported throughout the Immigration estate. The report was signed by sixteen bishops, four leading Muslim clerics, representatives of the Sikh and Hindu communities, four members of the House of Lords and the Member of Parliament for Crawley.

The Home Office response to this proposal was to pass it to the Immigration Minister who forwarded it to the head of the Immigration Service who in turn requested that it be actioned by the director responsible for Detention Operations. The Detention Operations department of the Immigration Service did not accept the findings of the report and expressed their displeasure at the centre's operating company (now Group 4) "interfering" in government policy issues and which resulted in the suspension of the centre's senior chaplain.

A month after this report was published; the newest facility in the Immigration estate, the £40 million Yarl's Wood detention centre near Bedford was largely destroyed by fire as a result of altercations between staff and detainees.

With a lack of support from the Immigration Service, the introduction of Group 4's management style (with its largely prison based philosophies) and the departure of the centre's original management team, the "Tinsley Model" became increasingly difficult to maintain resulting in a decline in the centre's previously caring regime.

In 2009 an unannounced inspection of Tinsley House by HM Chief Inspector of Prisons reported that "conditions had generally deteriorated and the arrangements for children and single women were now wholly
unacceptable" and that "staff talked openly about an increased prison culture encroaching on Tinsley House's previously relaxed atmosphere". The gradual erosion of the centre's initial regime of "Caring Custody" effectively marked the end of the "Tinsley Model" and with it the dynamic of the chaplaincy's intensive pastoral care which had been a fundamental feature of the model.

Deaths in immigration custody

The Government does not routinely publish the number of detainees who die in custody, but data mapping by INQUEST suggests that a further three individuals died while being held under Immgiration Act Powers during 2016, nine in 2017, three in 2018 and one in 2019. In 2018, the Government announced that it would begin publishing data on deaths in IRCs for the first time. However, the definitive annual number of deaths in detention remain unknown, as quarterly Home Office statistics do not differentiate between deaths and detainees leaving detention for "other" reasons.

In total, there have been at least 40 deaths in immigration custody since 1989, including:
 Siho Iyiguveni – 8 October 1989 -  Harmondsworth Detention Centre
 Kimpua Nsimba – 15 June 1990 -  Harmondsworth Detention Centre
 Robertus Grabys – Suicide by hanging, aged 49 24 January 2000 - Harmondsworth Detention Centre
 Michael Bodnarchuk - Suicide by hanging, aged 42, 31 January 2003 - Haslar Detention Centre
 Olga Blaskevica – Murdered by husband, aged 29, 7 May 2003 - Harmondsworth Detention Centre
 Kabeya Dimuka-Bijoux - Collapsed while running, aged 34, 1 May 2004 - Haslar Detention Centre
 Sergey Barnuyck – Suicide by hanging, aged 31, 19 July 2004 - Harmondsworth Detention Centre
 Tran Quang Tung – Suicide by hanging, aged 24, 23 July 2004 - Dungavel Detention Centre
 Kenny Peter – Suicide by hanging, aged 24, 7 November 2004 - Colnbrook Detention Centre
 Unknown male – AIDS, aged 33, 14 March 2005 - Oakington Detention Centre
 Ramazan Kumluca – Suicide by hanging, aged 18, 27 June 2005 - Campsfield Detention Centre
 Manuel Bravo – Suicide by hanging, aged 35, 15 September 2005 - Yarl's Wood Detention Centre
 Bereket Yohannes – Suicide by hanging, aged 26, 19 January 2006 - Harmondsworth Detention Centre
 Oleksiy Baronovsky – Self harm (cutting), aged 34, 10 June 2006 - HMP Rye Hill
 Unknown male – Tuberculosis, aged 32,  1 September 2008 - Colnbrook Detention Centre
 Richard Abeson – Liver cancer, aged 69, 23 October 2009 - HMP Wandsworth  
 Eliud Nguli Nyenze – Heart attack, aged 40, 15 April 2010 - Oakington Detention Centre
 Reza Ramazani – Coronory condition, aged 56, 23 March 2010 - HMP Nottingham
 Jimmy Mubenga – Unlawful killing, aged 46, 12 October 2010 - Aircraft, discharged from Brook House Detention Centre
 Riluwanu Balogan – Suicide by hanging, aged 21, 16 May 2011 - HM Glen Parva
 Muhammed Shuket, Heart attack, aged 47, 2 July 2011 - Colnbrook Detention Centre
 Brian Dalrymple – Schizophrenia, hypertension, aged 35, 31 July 2011 - Colnbrook Detention Centre
 Ianos Dragutan – Suicide by hanging, aged 31, 2 August 2011 - Campsfield Detention Centre
 Gonzales Jorite - Tuberculosis, aged 40, 6 December 2011 - Harmondsworth Detention Centre
 Kwabena Fosu - Sudden adult death syndrome, aged 31, 30 October 2012 - Harmondsworth Detention Centre
 Unknown male – Rheumatic valve disease, aged 43, 17 November 2012 - Harmondsworth Detention Centre
 Alois Dvorzac – Heart attack in dementia, aged 84, 10 February 2013 - Harmondsworth Detention Centre
 Khalid Shahzad – Suspected heart attack, aged 52, 30 March 2013 - Pennine House Immigration Reception Centre
 Tahir Mehmood – Heart attack, aged 43, 26 July 2013 - Pennine House Immigration Reception Centre
 Rene Frings – Heart disease, aged 44, 23 November 2011 - HMP Wormwood Scrubs
 Mohamoud Ali – Sudden death in epilepsy, aged 36, 1 February 2014 - HMP Parc
 Christine Case – Pulmonary embolism, aged 40, 30 March 2014 - Yarls Wood
 Bruno dos Santos – Neurosarcoidosis, aged 26, 4 June 2014 - HMP The Verne
 Rubel Ahmed – Suicide by hanging, aged 26, 5 September 2014 - IRC Morton Hall Lincoln
 Pinakinbhai Patel – Heart attack, aged 33, 20 April 2015 - Yarls Wood
 Thomas Kirung – Suicide by hanging, aged 30, 6 August 2015 - HMP The Verne
 Amir Siman-Tov – Suicide by overdose, aged 41, 17 February 2016 - Colnbrook Detention Centre 
 Unknown – 1 December 2016 - Colnbrook Detention Centre
 Unknown male – Murdered, aged 49, 30 November 2016 - IRC Morton Hall Lincoln
 Tarek Chowdhury - Murdered, aged 34, 30 December 2016 - IRC Morton Hall Lincoln
 Carlington Spencer – Stroke, aged 27, 3 October 2017 - IRC Morton Hall Lincoln

References

Illegal immigration to the United Kingdom
 
Deportation from the United Kingdom